Flunch is a French cafeteria-style fast casual restaurant chain owned by the Agapes Restauration group which belongs to Association Familiale Mulliez group. It operates over 160 locations in France and also 6 in Italy. Flunch restaurants are operated on a self-service basis, whereby customers directly access the food themselves.

History
The first Flunch branch opened in the Englos shopping centre on the outskirts of Lille in 1971.

In 2014, there were approximately 180 restaurants. 

In 2018, the company had over 170 restaurants in France and other abroad in Italy, Spain, Portugal, Poland and Russia.

In 2021, the company closed 39 restaurants and sold another 10.

Slogan 
 1997–2005: On va fluncher 
 2005–2007: Manger varié, c'est bien meilleur pour la santé
 2007–2009: Flunch, le plaisir intensément
 2009–2015: Fluncher, c'est mieux que manger !
 Since 2015: Y'a que chez Flunch qu'on peut fluncher

References

External links
Official website 
Official website 

Companies based in Hauts-de-France
French companies established in 1971
Fast-food chains of France
Fast casual restaurants
Restaurants established in 1971
Restaurant franchises
Villeneuve-d'Ascq